Bobby Kennedy for President is an American documentary television series that focuses on United States Senator Robert F. Kennedy and his political rise in the 1960s. The four-part first series was released on Netflix on April 27, 2018.

The series, run by director and executive producer Dawn Porter, looks at Kennedy's political lore, including his 1968 presidential campaign, which ended with his assassination on June 5, 1968 at the Ambassador Hotel in Los Angeles, California. The show uses archival footage during Kennedy's time as Attorney General and Senator, as well as conversations he had with his brothers, United States President John F. Kennedy and United States Senator Ted Kennedy.

In addition to archival footage, the show interviews dozens of individuals who, at one point, were in Kennedy's circle, including Rep. John Lewis, Dolores Huerta, Harry Belafonte, Marian Wright Edelman, and William vanden Heuvel.

Episodes

See also
 Cultural depictions of John F. Kennedy

References

External links 
  on Netflix
 

Netflix original documentary television series
2018 American television series debuts
2018 American television series endings
2010s American documentary television series
Kennedy family
Robert F. Kennedy
English-language Netflix original programming
Television series about presidents of the United States